Chackbay is a census-designated place (CDP) in northern Lafourche Parish, Louisiana, United States. The population was 5,370 in 2020. It is part of the Houma–Bayou Cane–Thibodaux metropolitan statistical area.

Chackbay is a part of the "Ward 6" area of Lafourche Parish.

Geography
Its northern boundary is the border with St. James Parish.

Settlement follows the major roads through the community, which follow higher ground. Large areas away from the roads are wetland and mainly undeveloped. Louisiana Highway 20 runs through the western part of the CDP, leading south  to Thibodaux, the parish seat, and northeast  to Vacherie. Highway 304 runs west and southwest from Highway 20 to Bayou Lafourche west of Thibodaux, and Highway 307 runs east to Kraemer. Unincorporated communities within the Chackbay CDP are, from west to east, Choupique, Chegby, and Chackbay.

Demographics

As of the 2020 United States census, there were 5,370 people, 2,003 households, and 1,564 families residing in the CDP.

Education
Lafourche Parish Public Schools operates public schools. Chackbay Elementary School serves the community. Sixth Ward Middle School and Thibodaux High School serve residents of the Ward 6 area.

Government and infrastructure
Residents are served by the Ward 6 Senior Citizens Center.

Notable people
Dee Dee Blanchard, homicide victim
Billy Tauzin, US congressman who lived in Clarks Summit while he was in office.

References

Census-designated places in Lafourche Parish, Louisiana
Census-designated places in Louisiana
Census-designated places in Houma – Thibodaux metropolitan area